Reni Gower is an American artist and curator working in the media of painting, installation, printmaking, papermaking, collage, and papercutting.

Recognition 
Gower's art has been exhibited and collected internationally at venues including VCU's Qatar Gallery, and the International Museum of Art & Science.

She received a College Art Association Distinguished Teaching Award in 2014. and a Pollock-Krasner Foundation grant in 2020.

References

Living people
21st-century American women artists
Year of birth missing (living people)

American women curators
American curators
21st-century American painters
Paper artists